Rivière Qui Barre is a river in Central Alberta, Canada.  The name is a translation, by early French-speaking settlers, of Keepootakawa (“river that bars the way”), the Cree name for the river.

Course 
Through sections of its course, Rivière Qui Barre is little more than a stream. The river starts near Busby, flows through a number of small lakes in the Alexander Indian Reserve, passes near the hamlet of Rivière Qui Barre, and eventually empties into the Sturgeon River.

Tributaries 
 Deadman Lake, Alberta
 Bard Lake, Alberta
 Low Water Lake, Alberta

References 

Rivers of Alberta